Social Research Center is a public legal entity that located in the Capital of Azerbaijan, Baku. The initial charter fund of the Center is 100.000 (one hundred thousand) AZN.

History 
The Center has been established according to the presidential decree signed on February 8, 2019. By the Decree of the President of the Republic of Azerbaijan dated February 11, 2019, Zahid Oruj has been appointed as the Chairman of the Management Board of Social Research Center.

Aims and activities 
The purpose of the Center is to provide the implementation of social research.

The center has the following activities mentioned below.

 Dealing with social research, analysis and forecasting in the Republic of Azerbaijan, as well as participating in the formulation and implementation of policy related to learning public opinion, 
 Analyzing the dynamics and tendencies of the development of mutual relations between the state and society, conducting surveys through the use of modern information technologies and innovative methods, studying public opinion, analyzing and making related propositions, carrying out scientific researches and cooperating with the relevant state bodies in this field.
 Enhancing and improving community-state contacts by the help of multifaceted activities in social platforms, modern information and communication technologies, as well as Internet information resources.
 Carry out social studies to improve the management process, to increase the effectiveness of the implemented reforms, as well as the possible impacts of the decisions and actions taken;
 Holding public hearings, debates on various issues of public interest, cooperating with civil society institutions in this area, setting up and managing broad discussion platforms.

Duties of the Center 
The Center has the following rights to carry out its duties:

 Making proposals on the adoption of a draft normative legal act relating to its activities, changes in the act, interpretation, suspension or cancellation of the act;
 Cooperating with international organizations, relevant state bodies (agencies) and other organizations of foreign countries in order to learn the possibilities of applying international experience, and also learn the relevant experience of foreign states;
 Providing paid services to state bodies (agencies), local self-governing bodies, legal entities and natural persons;
 Conducting research on issues related to its activities and creating relevant bodies and committees for the same reason;
 Making proposals for the implementation of innovations in the provision of services in the relevant field, to participate in their implementation, and cooperating with relevant governmental bodies (institutions), civil society institutions, legal entities, educational institutions, scientific institutions and organizations, international organizations in this area;
 Providing the necessary information (documents) to state bodies (bodies), local self-government bodies, legal entities and individuals and receive similar information (documents) from them;
 Making comments and suggestions on its activities, analyzing and summarizing related to its works, and preparing analytic materials;
 Involving independent experts and specialists in its activities in the manner prescribed by law;
 Holding conferences, meetings, seminars and other events related to its activities;
 Giving awards and other prizes to the employees and taking measures to encourage them;
 Establishing or participating in economic associations related to their activities;
 Releasing special bulletins and other publications;
 Carry out other rights defined by the Charter of the Center.

References 

Government agencies of Azerbaijan
Government of Azerbaijan